Siitonen is a Finnish surname. Notable people with the surname include:

Eva-Riitta Siitonen (born 1940), Finnish politician
Hannu Siitonen (born 1949), Finnish javelin thrower
Pauli Siitonen (born 1938), Finnish cross-country skier
Fredi (singer), stage name of the Finnish comedic actor, musician, singer/songwriter and television presenter Matti Kalevi Siitonen (born 1942)
Stig (singer), stage name of the Finnish singer Pasi Siitonen (born 1978)

Finnish-language surnames